Obermaier is a surname. Notable people with the surname include: 

 Albrecht Obermaier (1912–2004), German naval officer
 Frederik Obermaier (born 1984), German investigative journalist
 Hugo Obermaier (1877–1946), German prehistorian and anthropologist
 Otto G. Obermaier (born 1936), United States Attorney for the Southern District of New York
 Stefan Obermaier (born 1981), Austrian musician, producer and DJ
 Uschi Obermaier (born 1946), German model and actress, associated with the 1968 left-wing movement

See also
 Obermaier DF02, German autogyro, designed and produced by GyroTec Michael Obermaier
 Obermeyer
 9236 Obermair, asteroid discovered by Erich Meyer and named in Erwin Obermair honor
 Erwin Obermair, Austrian amateur astronomer and discoverer of asteroids (1946)
 Erich Obermayer, former Austrian football player (1953)
 Leopold Obermayer, Homosexual Jew of Swiss nationality, victim of Nazism (1892-1943)
 Franz Obermayr, Austrian Member of the European Parliament (1952)
 Siegfried Obermeier, German author of popular historical novels and history books (1936-2011)